NGC 4528 is a barred lenticular galaxy located about 50 million light-years away in the constellation Virgo. It was discovered by astronomer William Herschel on March 15, 1784. The galaxy is a member of the Virgo Cluster.

See also
 List of NGC objects (4001–5000)
 NGC 4340

References

External links
 
 

Virgo (constellation)
Barred lenticular galaxies
4528
41781
7722
Astronomical objects discovered in 1784
Virgo Cluster
Discoveries by William Herschel